Washington Avenue Historic District is a national historic district located at Evansville, Indiana.  It was listed on the National Register of Historic Places in 1980. The district, bounded roughly by Madison and Grand Avenues and East Gum and Parrett Streets, sprang up in the late 19th century, during an economic boom when the city's population went from 29,200 in 1880 to more than 59,000 by 1900.

When the neighborhood was nominated to the National Register of Historic Places in 1980, local preservationists cited the district's “important collection of late-Victorian frame houses” – grand styles, from Gothic Revival to French Second Empire, designed by the city's leading architects for some of its leading citizens. Among those who built stately homes on Washington Avenue were Max deJong, an importer and fine clothing retailer; Antonio Sierra, superintendent of the Fendrich Cigar Company; and William Akin Jr., a well-to-do meatpacker who later became mayor of Evansville.

The Washington Avenue district – where 23 percent of the houses have been demolished in the last quarter-century – never attracted the investment that other districts in the city have. Local and state preservation experts fear the demolition of structures in the Washington Avenue district along with the accelerating decline of what remains could jeopardize the area's status on the National Register of Historic Places.

References

Historic districts on the National Register of Historic Places in Indiana
Queen Anne architecture in Indiana
Italianate architecture in Indiana
Geography of Evansville, Indiana
Historic districts in Evansville, Indiana
National Register of Historic Places in Evansville, Indiana